A range of laws applying to or of specific relevance to Indigenous Australians. A number of laws have been passed since the European settlement of Australia, initially by the Parliament of the United Kingdom, then by the Governors or legislature of each of the  Australian colonies and more recently by the Parliament of Australia and that of each of its States and Territories, these laws, arranged chronologically, include:

See also
Aboriginal Land Rights Act 1976
History of Indigenous Australians
Native title in Australia
Native title legislation in Australia

References

Further reading
To 1987 -

External links
Indigenous Australia: Timeline - Contact 1901 - 1969 at the Australian Museum

Indigenous
Law
Law